Balassagyarmati Városi Sportegyesület is a professional football club based in Balassagyarmat, Nógrád County, Hungary, that competes in the Nemzeti Bajnokság III, the third tier of Hungarian football.

History
Balassagyarmat is going to compete in the 2017–18 Nemzeti Bajnokság III.

Honours

Domestic
Nógrád Megyei I:
Winner (2): 2016–17, 2018–19

Season results
As of 5 June 2018

External links
 Profile on Magyar Futball

References

Football clubs in Hungary
Association football clubs established in 1902
1902 establishments in Hungary
Balassagyarmat